This Year, Next Year, Sometime . . . ? is the second studio EP by British synthpop band Mirrors and the first release since the departure of Ally Young. The EP was released in order to finance the band's forthcoming second studio album and contains two previously released songs and five unreleased demos which were recorded during their first album sessions in June 2010 and in the 4th quarter of 2011.

Track listing

Personnel
All tracks:
 James New
 James Arguile
 Josef Page

Tracks 5 and 7 feature Ally Young. It is unsure which other tracks might also feature his input.

References

External links
 Official website
 Mirrors Bandcamp
 Mirrors discography

2012 EPs